Batasan and Batasang Pambansa commonly refers to the Batasang Pambansa Complex, the seat of the House of Representatives of the Philippines.

Batasan and Batasang Pambansa may also refer to:

Batasan Hills
Batasan Road
Batasan station
Batasang Bayan
Batasang Pambansa (legislature)
Interim Batasang Pambansa
Regular Batasang Pambansa